A quadrat is a frame, traditionally square, used in ecology, geography and biology to isolate a standard unit of area for study of the distribution of an item over a large area. Modern quadrats can for example be rectangular, circular, or irregular.  The quadrat is suitable for sampling plants, slow-moving animals, and some aquatic organisms.

A photo-quadrat is a photographic record of the area framed by a quadrat. It may use a physical frame to indicate the area, or may rely on fixed camera distance and lens field of view to automatically cover the specified area of substrate. Parallel laser pointers mounted on the camera can also be used as scale indicators. The photo is taken perpendicular to the surface, or as close as possible to perpendicular for uneven surfaces.

History

The systematic use of quadrats was developed by the pioneering plant ecologists R. Pound and F. E. Clements between 1898 and 1900. The method was then swiftly applied for many purposes in ecology, such as the study of plant succession. Botanists and ecologists such as Arthur Tansley soon took up and modified the method.

The ecologist J. E. Weaver applied the use of quadrats to the teaching of ecology in 1918.

Method

When an ecologist wants to know how many organisms there are in a particular habitat, it would not be feasible to count them all. Instead, they would be forced to count a smaller representative part of the population, called a sample. Sampling of plants or slowly moving animals (such as snails) can be done using a sampling square called a quadrat. A suitable size of a quadrat depends on the size of the organisms being sampled. For example, to count plants growing on a school field, one could use a quadrat with sides 0.5 or 1 metre in length. Choice of quadrat size depends to a large extent on the type of survey being conducted. For instance, it would be difficult to gain any meaningful results using a 0.5m2 quadrat in a study of a woodland canopy.

It is important that sampling in an area is carried out at random, to avoid bias. For example, if you were sampling from a school field, but for convenience only placed quadrats next to a path, this might not give a sample that was representative of the whole field. It would be an unrepresentative, or biased, sample. One way one can sample randomly is to place the quadrats at coordinates on a numbered grid.

Long-term studies may require that the same quadrats be revisited months or even years after initial sampling. Methods of relocating the precise area of study vary widely in accuracy, and include measurement from nearby permanent markers, use of total station theodolites, consumer-grade GPS, and differential GPS.

See also

Stand level modelling

References

External links
Ecological Sampling Methods

Ecology terminology
Environmental statistics
Environmental Sampling Equipment